Princess Maria Nikolaevna Bolkonskaya (Mar'ia Bolkonskaia)  is a fictional character in Leo Tolstoy's 1869 novel War and Peace.

Princess Maria, the sister of Prince Andrei Bolkonsky, is a deeply religious young woman who has resigned herself to an unmarried life to be with her domineering father, Prince Nikolai Bolkonsky. Princess Maria is a plain woman, whose lack of beauty is offset by her large, caring eyes. She is overshadowed by her beautiful French companion, Mademoiselle Bourienne. An attempt to marry her off to the profligate Prince Anatole Kuragin fails.

Princess Maria's father dies during the days leading to the battle of Borodino. The peasants on her Bogucharovo estate threaten to become violent and Maria is rescued by Nikolai Rostov. They fall in love, but several situations keep them apart and eventually they both forgo any hope of marriage. Maria's brother, Prince Andrei Bolkonsky, is seriously wounded in battle and chances to fall under the care of Natasha Rostova, with whom Princess Maria becomes close friends after witnessing Andrei Bolkonsky's death together. Maria marries the impoverished Nikolai Rostov in the winter of 1813, and eventually the couple have four children. Nikolai Rostov relies on his work and her moral support, not financial, to become a wealthy and content estate owner.

Stephen Vizinczey suggests that Tolstoy created Maria out of his longing for his mother, Princess Maria Nikolayevna Volkonskaya, who died before Tolstoy's second birthday.

See also
 List of characters in War and Peace

References

External links
 Princess Maria Bolkonskaya (Character) from Voyna i mir (1967), The Internet Movie Database

Characters in War and Peace
Fictional Russian people in literature
Female characters in literature
Literary characters introduced in 1869